The 1914 Idaho gubernatorial election was held on November 3, 1914. Democratic nominee Moses Alexander defeated incumbent Republican John M. Haines with 44.13% of the vote.

General election

Candidates
Major party candidates
Moses Alexander, Democratic
John M. Haines, Republican 

Other candidates
Hugh E. McElroy, Progressive
L. A. Coblentz, Socialist

Results

References

1914
Idaho
Gubernatorial